Kuttram Purinthal is a 2023 Indian Tamil-language action drama film directed by Disney and starring Adhik Babu, Abhinaya and Archana. It was released on 24 February 2023.

Cast

Production
Production on the film began in early 2018, with Abhinaya selected to portray a police officer. The film marked the debut of actor Aadhik Babu.

Reception 
The film was released on 24 February 2023 across Tamil Nadu. A critic from Dina Thanthi gave the film a mixed review while praising twists introduced into the screenplay of the film. Maalai malar critic gave a mixture of reviews noted that "Disney can be appreciated for taking up the current issue in society"

References

External links 
 

 2023 films
 2020s Tamil-language films